Below are the rosters for the Liga Venezolana de Beisbol Profesional (LVBP), an off-season baseball league owned and operated by Major League Baseball in Venezuela.

LVBP rosters

Navegantes del Magallanes

Leones del Caracas

Tigres de Aragua

External links
Liga Venezolana de Beisbol Profesional

Rosters